Mean (which stands for Music, Entertainment, Art, News) is an American bi-monthly magazine that covers a wide spectrum of pop culture, focusing on celebrities in the fields of music, fashion, art, and film.

History and profile
Mean began as a music zine and alternative magazine in November 1996 and continued in that format through 2001, before being re-launched as a national lifestyle publication in 2004. Mean is published by Kashy Khaledi Media and distributed by Curtis Circulation. Its headquarters is in Los Angeles.

Mean has featured a broad assortment of personalities on its cover. Covers have included Viggo Mortensen, Adrien Brody, Emily Blunt, Samuel L. Jackson and Christina Ricci, Emile Hirsch, Javier Bardem, and Ewan McGregor portraying Woody Allen.

References

External links 
 Mean Magazine Online
 Curtis Circulation

Bimonthly magazines published in the United States
Lifestyle magazines published in the United States
Fashion magazines published in the United States
Music magazines published in the United States
Magazines established in 1996
Magazines published in Los Angeles